The Associated Private Schools (APS) is a sporting association of eight private schools in Gold Coast, Queensland, Australia.

Current member schools

Sports

Results

Australian rules football

Open Boys Finals

Open Girls Finals

Basketball

Open A Boys Finals

Netball

1st VII Finals

Rugby

1st XV Finals

Water Polo

Open A Boys Finals

See also
 List of schools in Gold Coast, Queensland

References

External links

Australian school sports associations
Sport on the Gold Coast, Queensland